Boško Ćirković (Serbian Cyrillic:Бошко Ћирковић) (born 4 December 1976) better known as Škabo (Serbian Cyrillic: Шкабо) is a rapper, beatmaker and producer from Belgrade, Serbia. He has released three albums as a member of Beogradski Sindikat, nine solo albums and one album together with his wife, under the name PKS.

Beginnings 
Before Beogradski Sindikat, Škabo was a member of underground rap group called Red Zmaja (Order of the Dragon). Then in 1999, alongside eight other MC's he founded Beogradski sindikat. He participated in almost every aspect of making the BSSST...Tišinčina - their first album. Besides still being a part of Beograski sindikat, he is now also a part of newly formed band F4 (Fantastic Four) which includes Škabo, DJ Iron and Zobla (not from Beogradski Sindikat, but Skabo's cousin) and Marlon Brutal.

Work outside music 
From 2001 to 2005 he worked as radio host on Radio SKC. His show was called Sindikalni termin and it was about Serbian hip-hop, demo-groups and events.

During 2003 he was writing a column for Glas javnosti daily.

He is also one of the founders and a CEO of "Magmedia" d.o.o. company for protection and exploitation of intellectual property.

He is currently writing a column for Večernje novosti daily and music reviews for Serbian editions of Maxim and Playboy magazines.

He is also co-author of radio show "Treći put" ("The Third Way") on RTS's Belgrade 202 channel.

Škabo also appears in Boris Malagurski's documentary film The Weight of Chains in which he advocates social change in Serbia.

Discography 
As a member of Beogradski Sindikat:
1998: Gistro
2001: BSSST...Tišinčina
2002: Govedina
2005: Svi Zajedno
2006: Oni su
2010: Diskretni Heroji

Solo:
2003: Škabo - Sam
2005: PKS (Škabo & Nadica) - PVO
2008: Škabo - Remek delo
2009: Škabo - Deset Dina Glasa Na Matrici
2010: Škabo - Muzika za demonstracije]]
2011: Škabo - Čovek
2011: Škabo - Vuk (EP)
2012: Škabo - Beskonačno
2014: Škabo - Priča 2 Vuka
2015: Škabo - Toprek X Škabo (EP)
2017: (Škabo & Žobla) - Kalaši i Nive (EP)

See also 
Serbian hip hop
Political hip hop

External links 
 Beogradski Sindikat (Serbian)
 Škabo Myspace page (Serbian)

1976 births
Living people
Musicians from Belgrade
Serbian rappers
Serbian hip hop DJs